Sky-Watch A/S is a Danish developer and manufacturer of Unmanned Aerial Vehicles (UAV).  Founded in 2009, Sky-Watch is based in Støvring, Denmark.

In 2016 - Sky-Watch purchases the small startup company "Little Smart Things" in Nexø. And continues the Cumulus and Heidrun platforms.

Products 
Sky-Watch provides platforms with various configurations. Currently the platforms are:

 Huginn
 Heidrun
 Cumulus

Discontinued products:

 Huginn X1
 Huginn X1D

Notable Uses 

 In 2013 Sky-Watch provided a Huginn X1 quadcopter to the USAR teams deployed in the Philippines after the typhoon Haiyan raged over the islands.

References

External links 
 Official Website

Technology companies established in 2009
Technology companies of Denmark
Unmanned aerial vehicle manufacturers
Aerospace companies
Danish brands
Publicly traded companies